Mount & Blade: With Fire & Sword is a stand-alone expansion for the action role-playing video game Mount & Blade. The game is developed by Sich Studio and TaleWorlds and was published by Paradox Interactive in Europe. The game and its storyline is loosely based on the novel With Fire and Sword by Henryk Sienkiewicz, depicting Poland's 1648–1651 war against the Khmelnytsky Uprising in present-day Ukraine, and its sequels dealing with the invasion of Poland by Sweden and with Polish wars against the Ottoman Empire.

Gameplay

The gameplay is based on that of Mount & Blade, with similar controls in regards to melee and archery. Like its predecessors, With Fire and Sword is an action role-playing game. This installment allows the player to fight for one of five factions in an effort to control Eastern Europe, however only three have a proper storyline. The game is set in a later, more modern period than earlier titles with access to pistols, grenades, and other equipment of the post-medieval era. Unlike other installments of the game, With Fire & Sword does not allow you to play as female, only being allowed to play as male. But, within the files, you may change the settings to allow this.

Factions
The factions are:
 Kingdom of Sweden
 Cossack Hetmanate
 Polish Commonwealth
 Muscovite Tsardom
 Crimean Khanate

Reception

With Fire & Sword received "average" reviews according to the review aggregation website Metacritic. GameZone said, "Mount & Blade: With Fire and Sword is the right fit for anyone interested in sweeping historical epics as well as incredibly complex and realistic RPGs. A fantastic entry for fans of the genre." However, many players complained about the aiming mechanics, and some players on Steam complained that Mount & Blade: With Fire and Sword was "more like additional content for classic mode than its own game".

References

External links
TaleWorlds' website
Snowberry Connection' website

Role-playing video games
Action role-playing video games
Multiplayer online games
Open-world video games
TaleWorlds games
Video game expansion packs
Video games based on novels
Windows games
Windows-only games
2011 video games
Video games developed in Ukraine
Video games set in the 17th century
Paradox Interactive games
Historical simulation games
Video games set in Poland
Video games set in castles
1C Company games
Multiplayer and single-player video games